"High Hopes" is a song by American pop rock band Panic! at the Disco. The song was released through Fueled by Ramen and DCD2 Records on May 23, 2018, as the second single from the band's sixth studio album, Pray for the Wicked (2018). The song was written and produced by Jake Sinclair and Jonas Jeberg, and co-written by Brendon Urie, Jenny Owen Youngs, Lauren Pritchard, Sam Hollander, William Lobban-Bean, Taylor Parks, and Ilsey Juber, with additional production by Jonny Coffer. It was serviced to alternative radio on July 31, 2018, and impacted hot adult contemporary radio on August 27, 2018, and US pop radio the following day. The music video was also released on August 27, 2018.

"High Hopes" peaked at number four on the US Billboard Hot 100, becoming the band's highest-charting song on the chart, surpassing their 2006 breakout single, the top 10 hit "I Write Sins Not Tragedies." It topped the charts in Poland and reached the top ten and top twenty in several countries, becoming their highest-charting single worldwide. 
It holds the record for most weeks spent at number one on the US Hot Rock Songs chart, at 65 weeks. It also became the act's first single to top one of Billboards Dance/Electronic charts, reaching number-one on its Dance/Mix Show Airplay list in February 2019."Mark Ronson & Miley Cyrus Top Dance Club Songs Chart With 'Nothing Breaks Like a Heart'" from Billboard (February 7, 2019)

Background
"High Hopes" was written and produced by Jake Sinclair and Jonas Jeberg, and co-written by Brendon Urie, Jenny Owen Youngs, Lauren Pritchard, Sam Hollander, William Lobban-Bean, Taylor Parks, and Ilsey Juber; with additional production by Jonny Coffer. Jeberg, Parks, Juber, and Lobban-Bean began writing the song at a BMI writing camp in Aspen, Colorado in 2015. When the four of them had arrived an hour early, they decided to go into a hot tub together outside. Jeberg has said of the song's conception: "I was sitting in the hot tub, singing bass notes. We didn't have any instruments because we were in the hot tub. I was singing bass notes and directing chords in that way, and we were brainstorming different lyrics." Eventually they set up a portable recording studio and began recording a demo version with a beat, horns and vocals. Initially, the song's hook was conceived as a rap song, and they began sending it to different artists who all declined. In 2016, Panic! at the Disco's management company said the band wanted to record the song for their next studio album. In early 2018, lead singer Brendon Urie co-wrote the verses for "High Hopes," before Sinclair and Jeberg (later, Coffer) were brought in to finish the production.

Composition
The song is written in the key of F major with a tempo of 82 beats per minute. During their live performances, it's sung in the key of Eb major. Urie's vocals span from the low note D3 to the high note of D5.

Music video
The audio track was uploaded to Panic! at the Disco's official YouTube channel on the same day of its release on May 23, 2018. An official music video for the song was uploaded on August 27, 2018. As of January 2023, the music video has surpassed 711 million views.

The video features lead vocalist Brendon Urie walking through Los Angeles as people bump into him. Eventually, he sizes up a skyscraper with a glass exterior. Determined, he presses a foot to the glass, flips horizontally, and begins walking up the outside of the wall. People flock to the base of the building, recording Urie and watching with awe. He waves to the people below and inside the building, and finally gets to the roof as the crowd below applauds.  As the sun sets, he joins the rest of the band on the roof and continues to sing the final chorus of the song.

Live performances
To promote the album, the band performed the song at the 2018 MTV Video Music Awards and their concert on The Today Show.

Critical reception
Paste magazine described it as having "a blaring brass section" and "crisp vocals." Rolling Stone described it as "upbeat" and having "punchy horns."

Commercial performance
"High Hopes" peaked at number four on the Billboard Hot 100, making it Panic! at the Disco's highest-charting song, exceeding the peak of "I Write Sins Not Tragedies", which reached number seven 12 years prior. In August 2019, the song became one of the few songs to spend a full year on the chart when it logged its 52nd week on the chart. Also in the United States, it reached number one on the Radio Songs airplay chart, marking their first leader there. Worldwide, the song has charted highly, reaching number seven in Australia and number twelve in the United Kingdom, also becoming their highest-charting song in those countries. Also, "High Hopes" is the fourth song to top the Pop Songs, Adult Pop Songs and Alternative Songs charts simultaneously since the Adult Pop Songs chart began in Billboard in March 1996, the Pop Songs chart began in October 1992 and the Alternative Songs chart began in September 1988. Also, with 14 weeks on top of Radio Songs, "High Hopes" tied Alicia Keys' "No One" and Celine Dion's "Because You Loved Me" for fifth longest-leading number one on the Radio Songs chart, which began in 1990.

With 15 weeks on top of Adult Pop Songs, "High Hopes" became the longest-leading No. 1 on the Adult Pop Songs chart of the 2010s, which began in Billboards pages in March 1996. "High Hopes" also has the distinction of being the first Panic! at the Disco song to register on the Billboard Adult Contemporary chart, where it peaked at number eight. In June 2019, "High Hopes" broke the record for most weeks at No. 1 on Billboards Hot Rock Songs chart, logging 34 consecutive weeks at the top. On the chart dated January 18, 2020, "High Hopes" set a new record on Billboards Hot Rock Songs chart, logging its 52nd week at the top - an entire year. It went on to spend a total of 65 weeks atop the chart, eventually dethroned by Twenty One Pilots' "Level of Concern", another release from Fueled by Ramen label, on April 25, 2020. It was ranked number-one on the 2019 Year-End Rock Songs chart.

 Use in media and politics 
When the song first came out, NBC and NBCSN used it to promote their coverage of the 2018 Stanley Cup Finals which had the band's hometown team, the Vegas Golden Knights, in the finals against the Washington Capitals. The band later performed the song before Game 5, the final game of the series, which resulted in a 4–2 victory for the Capitals, who claimed their first Stanley Cup in franchise history over the Knights, winning the series 4–1.

Later on that year, CBS Sports used "High Hopes" to promote their featured SEC Game of the Week.

In 2019, Rede Globo used "High Hopes" as the background music for advertisements for its streaming service Globoplay to advertise its offerings and programs. The song was also used in the trailer for the 2019 animated film Klaus.

The song was the campaign anthem of 2020 Democratic Party presidential candidate Pete Buttigieg and was played at most of his rallies and speeches. A special dance to the song was created by staff and volunteers of the Buttigieg campaign. It was also used by candidates Amy Klobuchar, Cory Booker and Julian Castro in the 2020 Democratic Party presidential primaries.

The song was featured and remixed in the heavily panned YouTube Rewind 2018: Everyone Controls Rewind. It was used in the soundtrack for the NHL 19 video game, as well as the trailers for films such as the 2021 animated film The Mitchells vs. the Machines and the 2019 animated Christmas film Klaus.

The song was used at a Trump re-election rally in June 2020, to which Urie tweeted "Dear Trump Campaign, Fuck you. You’re not invited. Stop playing my song. No thanks, Brendon Urie, Panic! At The Disco & company," which was accompanied by a cease and desist order and a voter registration link encouraging fans to vote against Trump in November.

The song is used as the walk on song for 2022 UK Open champion, Danny Noppert.

Awards and nominations

Track listingDigital download – White Panda remix"High Hopes" (White Panda Remix) – 2:56Digital download – Don Diablo remix"High Hopes" (Don Diablo Remix) – 3:05Digital download – live version'
"High Hopes" (Live) – 3:22

Credits and personnel

Brendon Urie – lead vocals, backing vocals, writer, drums, piano
Jake Sinclair – writer, producer, guitar, backing vocals, bass
Jenny Owen Youngs – writer
Lauren Pritchard – writer
Sam Hollander – writer
William Lobban-Bean – writer, programmer
Jonas Jeberg – writer, producer
Taylor Parks – writer
Ilsey Juber – writer, backing vocals
Jonny Coffer – additional producer, programmer
Kenneth Harris – guitar, backing vocals
Rouble Kapoor – engineer
Suzy Shinn – engineer, backing vocals
Claudius Mittendorfer – mixer
Rob Mathes – conductor, horns arranger
Bruce Dukov – violin
Katia Popov – violin
Charlie Bisharat – violin
Steve Erdody – cello
Peter Hanson – violin
Peter Lale – viola
Thomas Bowes – violin
Caroline Dale – cello
Emlyn Singleton – violin
Tom Pigott-Smith – violin
Cathy Thompson – violin
Bruce White – viola
Julie Gigante – violin
Morgan Jones – saxophone
Warren Zielinski – violin
Rita Manning – violin
Maya Magub – violin
Brian Dembow – viola
Shawn Mann – viola
Tereza Stanislav – violin
Serena McKinney – violin
Robert Brophy – viola
Helen Nightengale – violin
Jessica Guideri – violin
Eric Byers – cello
Zach Dellinger – viola
Tim Gill – cello
Jackie Hartley – violin
Lisa Liu – violin
Jonathan Bradley – trumpet
Jacob Braun – cello
Ryan Dragon – trombone
Mike Rocha – trumpet
Peter Slocombe – saxophone
Nicole Row – bass
Jesse Molloy – saxophone
Jason Fabus – saxophone
Emily Lazar – mastering
Amber Jones – mastering
Chris Allgood – mastering
Jason Moser – mastering
Rachel White – mastering
Sacha Bambadji – mastering

Charts

Weekly charts

Year-end charts

Decade-end charts

Certifications

References

2018 singles
2018 songs
Fueled by Ramen singles
Number-one singles in Poland
Panic! at the Disco songs
Pete Buttigieg
Songs written by Ilsey Juber
Songs written by Jake Sinclair (musician)
Songs written by Jonas Jeberg
Songs written by Lolo (singer)
Songs written by Sam Hollander
Songs written by Tayla Parx
Songs written by Cook Classics